The Church of Jesus Christ of Latter-day Saints in the Republic of the Congo refers to the Church of Jesus Christ of Latter-day Saints (LDS Church) and its members in the Republic of the Congo. The country was opened to the church's missionaries in 1991. Since then, the church has grown to more than 10,000 members in 28 congregations.

History

Stakes

As of February 2023, the following stakes existed in the Republic of the Congo:

The Mindouli Branch, Ouésso Branch, and the Republic of Congo Brazzaville Mission Branch are not part of a stake or district.  The Republic of Congo Brazzaville Mission Branch serves individuals and families not in proximity to a church meetinghouse.

Missions
The Republic of the Congo Brazzaville Mission boundaries is the same as the country's boundaries.

Temples
The Kinshasa Democratic Republic of the Congo Temple was dedicated on 14 April 2019 by Dale G. Renlund. While not in the Republic of the Congo, this temple is located in proximity to the stakes in the Brazzaville area. On April 3, 2022, church president Russell M. Nelson announced the church will build a temple in Brazzaville.

See also

Religion in the Republic of the Congo

References

External links
 The Church of Jesus Christ of Latter-day Saints (Central Africa Area) - Official Site
 LDS Church - The Church of Jesus Christ of Latter-day Saints in the Congo Newsroom 
 ComeUntoChrist.org Latter-day Saints Visitor site

 
Protestantism in the Republic of the Congo
Religion in the Republic of the Congo